Varsamonerou or Valsamonerou Monastery ( or Βαλσαμόνερου) is a deserted  Eastern Orthodox monastery situated near the village of Voriza of the Heraklion regional unit in south-central Crete, Greece. It is built on the south slopes of Mt. Ida, at a location approximately 55 km southwest of Heraklion that offers a panoramic view of the Mesara Plain.

History
The monastery dates from the early Venetian period but the exact date of its establishment is unknown. Venetian archives dating as early as 1332 refer to it as Chiesa della Madonna di Varsamonero. The monastery acted a regional monastic and cultural centre until the 15th century. The nearby Vrontisi Monastery was established as its metochion around 1400. According to an inventory taken in 1644, the Monastery had in its possession various philosophical texts and manuscripts by Xenophon, Aeschines and Plutarch.
Varsamonerou monastery started to decline after 1500 and was eventually abandoned in the 18th century, not to be inhabited again.

Architecture
The main building is a two-nave church (katholikon). The northern nave is dedicated to the Virgin Mary Hodegetria and the southern one to John the Baptist. A third, transverse nave is dedicated to Saint Phanourios. The church is covered with high-quality frescoes that date from the late 14th until the first half of the 15th centuries. These frescoes are among the most important samples executed in Crete during the Venetian era and survive in excellent condition. The church was restored in 1947.

The exceptional wood-carved iconostasis of the church is nowadays displayed at the Historical Museum in Heraklion.

Current status
Today, the monastery is inactive. Restoration works overseen by the Ephorate of Byzantine Antiquities are ongoing.

References

Buildings and structures in Heraklion (regional unit)
Monasteries in Crete
Christian monasteries established in the 13th century
Greek Orthodox monasteries in Greece